Azja (also Azja, son of Tuhaj-Bej) is a fictional character in the novel Fire in the Steppe by Henryk Sienkiewicz. He is an antagonist and the rival of Michał Wołodyjowski. He's a Tatar who wants to kidnap Barbara Jeziorkowska, settle some Crimean Tatars on the uninhabited regions of Ukraine to protect Poland's borders (like Zaporozhian Cossacks) and become a "Tatar hetman" in the service of the Polish Crown.

Although Azja is a fictional character, his father is a historical figure.

In Jerzy Hoffman's 1969 film adaptation, Azja is portrayed by Daniel Olbrychski.

References

See also 
Lipka Tatars

Sienkiewicz's Trilogy
Fictional Polish people
Literary characters introduced in 1884
Characters in novels of the 19th century